Gleiberg is a hill and extinct volcano in Hesse, Germany.

Hills of Hesse